Castilleja lemmonii is a species of Indian paintbrush known by the common name Lemmon's Indian paintbrush or meadow paintbrush.

It is native to the higher elevations of the Sierra Nevada and Southern Cascade Range in California, and just into western Nevada. It grows in moist meadows.

Description
Castilleja lemmonii  is a perennial herb 10 to 20 centimeters tall coated in glandular hairs. The leaves are 2 to 4 centimeters long and linear to narrowly lance-shaped. 

The inflorescence is made up of many purple- or pink-tipped greenish bracts. Between the bracts appear small yellowish flowers.

References

External links
Jepson Manual Treatment of Castilleja lemmonii
Castilleja lemmonii - UC Photos gallery

lemmonii
Flora of California
Flora of Nevada
Flora of the Cascade Range
Flora of the Sierra Nevada (United States)
Plants described in 1878